Walkerville Township is one of thirteen townships in Greene County, Illinois, USA.  As of the 2010 census, its population was 233 and it contained 111 housing units.

Geography

Unincorporated towns
 Haypress at 
 Walkerville at 
(This list is based on USGS data and may include former settlements.)

Cemeteries
The township contains these eight cemeteries: Bridgewater, Kinser, Likely, Parr, Rollins, Sweeten, Walkerville and William Wood.

Airports and landing strips
 Martin Airport
 Orton Landing Field

Rivers
 Illinois River

Lakes
 Brushy Lake

Demographics

School districts
 Carrollton Community Unit School District 1
 North Greene Unit School District 3

Political districts
 Illinois' 17th congressional district
 State House District 97
 State Senate District 49

References
 
 United States Census Bureau 2007 TIGER/Line Shapefiles
 United States National Atlas

External links
 City-Data.com
 Illinois State Archives

Townships in Greene County, Illinois
Townships in Illinois